NetTutor is a Web-based online tutoring service, founded in 1995, in Tampa, Florida. All NetTutor operations are conducted at LSI’s main office in Tampa, Florida.

History

Link-Systems International was launched in 1995 with the goal of making academic resources available on the Web.
The company was incorporated in the State of Florida on February 27, 1996. NetTutor was the firm's first product and went live later that year. LSI began to lease the technology supporting NetTutor (also under the NetTutor name) in the following year. The NetTutor website, trademark, and interface technology are owned by Link-Systems International (LSI), a privately held distance-learning software corporation in Tampa, Florida. NetTutor went live in 1996, making it possibly the first private online tutoring service to provide tutoring in which the learner could choose tutoring that is either synchronous, with tutor and learner simultaneously online, or asynchronous, where the learner submits questions and receives a tutor's response via direct messaging. In 2016, the company announced that NetTutor had conducted three million online tutoring sessions. LSI also develops, maintains, and leases hosted access to the proprietary Java-based whiteboard-style interface (WorldWideWhiteboard) with which NetTutor conducts tutoring.

Textbook publishers

NetTutor was apparently the first online tutoring service to integrate with textbooks. Access to NetTutor, for instance, has been packaged with certain McGraw-Hill math, science, and accounting books since approximately 1997. Over the subsequent years, NetTutor has been packaged with higher education textbooks published by John Wiley and Sons, Pearson, Cengage Learning, and Bedford, Freeman and Worth.

Research on the NetTutor interface
Early research into NetTutor was conducted by educators eager to employ technology in their own teaching. Consequently, it focuses on technical issues such as usability and robustness, but also on the ability of participants to express themselves in effective online discussion of specialized subjects, especially mathematics. A study at Hampton University in 1999 concluded that NetTutor could effectively support activities such as online office hours.

The whiteboard-like nature of the NetTutor interface (today marketed separately by LSI as the WorldWideWhiteboard®) became known for offering tools to support subject-specific online chat and to illustrate concepts. In 2004, researchers at Stony Brook University found that despite some flaws, according to our research NetTutor remains the only workable math-friendly e-learning communication system."

Similar results were found using NetTutor technology and tutors at Utah Valley State College (in a study describing the use of NetTutor as "one of the earliest synchronous models for math  tutoring]") and at the University of Idaho, in a study beginning in 2005—showing increasing acceptance of Web-based  online tutoring in the university setting.

Usage
By 2007, LSI claimed that its NetTutor tutors had conducted over one million online tutorial sessions and by 2016, NetTutor had conducted more than three million tutorial sessions.

The service has expanded from its initial ties with the textbook publishing industry and now directly reaches learners in a variety of  environments, such as at college-track high school programs, for-profit schools, programs associated with the labor movement, public universities, and community colleges.

Today

Learners acquire access to NetTutor either by

 Direct purchase of tutoring time from the NetTutor website.
 Purchase of a textbook which has NetTutor support package with it from a publisher.
 Enrollment in a school or specific courses in a school which has chosen NetTutor as the vendor for either a limited or unlimited amount of tutoring for its students.

The NetTutor service is typically integrated into an existing virtual learning environment such as a publisher Web portal, a learning management system like Blackboard, Moodle, or Sakai, or else into a specific campus tutoring website requiring the student to enter special access codes.

NetTutor assistance is of the "academic-assistance" type. Conversations take place in a shared virtual whiteboard environment. In addition to providing for the free placement of text on the screen, the whiteboard is equipped with a toolbar for inserting math, chemistry, accounting, or English proofing symbols. Learners may submit their writing or questions for tutor review, or may choose an available live tutor and engage synchronous discussion. Learners may save or print out their live tutorial sessions, but live tutoring is exclusively one-on-one, so that the possible benefits of a discussion involving a group of peers (see, for instance, Jacques, et al., in Learning in Groups: A Handbook for on and off line environments (2007)) are not directly available.

This mode of access opens NetTutor to several criticisms, such as the accusation that tutors have an interest in exhausting the tutoring hours paid for, in order to get them to purchase more, or, on the other hand, that the tutor may rush the tutorial session by providing an answer to do more sessions and enable the learner to engage in academic dishonesty. NetTutor claims to have elaborate tutor vetting and training programs. In addition, LSI agrees upon detailed tutoring guidelines with representatives of its institutional clients. This differentiates NetTutor sharply from sites such as Student of Fortune, the founder of which describes academic dishonesty in online tutoring as "something that is definitely going to happen.".

Recent research published about NetTutor suggests that offering students the use of online tutoring as a resource in a traditional "brick-and-mortar" setting leads to an increase in student persistence and achievement.

Controversies surrounding online tutoring

LSI, apparently in response to several controversies that surround the use of distance education and  online tutoring, has taken some measures to assure users of the academic value of NetTutor. The main issues are shown in the table below, with an explanation of each. LSI claims that NetTutor answers each concern, as shown. It can be seen that, even with these policies, there may be extensive due-diligence requirements, the responsibility for which may fall on the user of the service.

Notes

References

 Collison, G., Elbaum, B., Haavind, S. & Tinker, R. (2000). Facilitating online learning: Effective strategies for moderators. Atwood Publishing, Madison.
 Hewitt, Beth L. (2010). The online writing conference: a guide for teachers and tutors. Boynton/Cook Heinemann, Portsmouth, NJ.
 Jacques, D., and Salmon, G (2007) Learning in Groups: A Handbook for on and off line environments, Routledge, London and New York.

American educational websites
Online tutoring
Educational math software
Science education software